The Petite Creuse (the small Creuse) is a  long river in Allier and Creuse departments, in central France. It is a left tributary of the Creuse into which it flows at Fresselines. The river is dammed at several locations creating valley lakes that are extensively used for recreation, such as fishing, boating and swimming. The dams are used to generate electricity and to supply water treatment plants providing drinking water to local communities.

Departments and communes along its course
This list ist ordered from source to mouth:
Allier: Treignat 
Creuse: Soumans, Lavaufranche, Leyrat, Saint-Silvain-Bas-le-Roc, Boussac-Bourg, Boussac, Malleret-Boussac, Clugnat, Bétête, Saint-Dizier-les-Domaines, Genouillac, Moutier-Malcard, Bonnat, Malval, Linard, Chéniers, Lourdoueix-Saint-Pierre, Chambon-Sainte-Croix, Nouzerolles, Fresselines

References

Rivers of France
Rivers of Auvergne-Rhône-Alpes
Rivers of Nouvelle-Aquitaine
Rivers of Allier
Rivers of Creuse